Perumbala  is a village in Chemnad Panchayat Kasaragod district in the state of Kerala, India. Perumbala is a small village located in Kasaragod taluk of Kasaragod district in Kerala with total 1,677 families residing. The Perumbala village has population of 8,096 of which 3,789 are males while 4,307 are females as per Population Census 2011.

Demographics
 India census, Perumbala had a population of 6889 with 3305 males and 3584 females.

References

Suburbs of Kasaragod